British Airways flies to various destinations across the world. In addition to destinations offered by British Airways itself, many more towns and cities can be reached through BA's franchise and subsidiary operations. Together with wholly owned subsidiary BA CityFlyer and franchise carriers Sun Air operate aircraft in full British Airways livery, offer full BA service and staff wear BA uniform. Bookings are made through British Airways and the carriers are affiliate members of the oneworld alliance.

Sun Air
Sun Air serve the following destinations in Europe as a BA franchisee (as of August 2010):

Belgium
Brussels - Brussels Airport
Denmark
Aalborg - Aalborg Airport
Aarhus - Aarhus Airport Base
Billund - Billund Airport Hub
Germany
Düsseldorf - Düsseldorf Airport
Hamburg - Hamburg Airport
Munich - Munich Airport
Friedrichshafen - Friedrichshafen Airport
Norway
Oslo - Oslo Airport, Gardermoen
Bergen - Bergen Airport
Sweden
Gothenburg - Göteborg Landvetter Airport
Stockholm - Stockholm-Bromma Airport
United Kingdom
London - London City Airport
Cambridge - Cambridge Airport
Manchester - Manchester Airport

References

Destinations Franchise
Lists of airline destinations
United Kingdom aviation-related lists